Rwimi is a town in Bunyangabu District in the Western Region of Uganda. With an estimated population of 16,200 in 2020 it is the largest urban center in the district,  but the district headquarters are located  elsewhere; in Kibiito.

Location
The town sits on the border between Bunyangabu District and Kasese District to south, in the Rwenzori Mountains. The coordinates of the town are 0°22'41.0"N, 30°12'59.0"E (Latitude:0.378056; Longitude:30.216389).

Overview
During the 1990s, Rwimi, then still a trading centre, survived several attacks by the Allied Democratic Forces.

Since about 2018, Rwimi has undergone rapid expansion, including the construction of new  commercial buildings. This followed the elevation of Bunyangabu County to district status in 2017.

Population
In 2014, the national population census put the population of Rwimi at 16,256.

In 2015, Uganda Bureau of Statistics (UBOS) estimated the population of Rwimi at 16,500 people. In 2020, the population agency estimated the population of the town at 18,600 people, of whom 9,600 (51.6 percent) were males and 9,000 (48.4 percent) were females. UBOS calculated the annual population growth rate of the town's population, to average 2.42 percent between 2015 and 2020.

Points of interest
The following points of interest lie within the town or near its edges:

1. The offices of Rwimi Town Council

2. Rwimi Central Market

3. Rwimi Power Station

4. The Fort Portal-Kasese-Mpondwe Road passes through the town in a general north to south configuration.

See also
 Toro Kingdom
 List of cities and towns in Uganda

References

External links
 Rwimi was a municipality in Kabarole District. It is now in Banyangabu District

Populated places in Western Region, Uganda
Cities in the Great Rift Valley
Toro sub-region
Bunyangabu District